Charlesworth is a British crime television series which first aired on BBC in 1959. A police procedural, it starred Wensley Pithey as  Detective Superintendent Charlesworth, with Tony Church as Detective Sergeant Spence. It followed on from the previous year's Charlesworth at Large .

Other actors who appeared include Lana Morris, Barbara Shelley, George Coulouris, Arnold Ridley, Terence Alexander, William Mervyn, Wally Patch, Naomi Chance, Leslie Perrins, Edward Evans, James Raglan, Leonard Sachs, Ina De La Haye, Austin Trevor, Sheila Burrell, Jack Hedley, Frank Pettingell, Robert Raglan, Olive Sloane, Josephine Tewson, Mary Kerridge, Patrick Troughton, John Forbes-Robertson, Willoughby Goddard, Elizabeth Shepherd, Norman Mitchell, Sam Kydd and Justine Lord.

References

Bibliography
 Radio Times, Volume 143. G. Newnes, 1959.

External links
 

BBC television dramas
1959 British television series debuts
1959 British television series endings
1950s British crime television series
English-language television shows